うんち

Spatagobrissus is a genus of echinoderms belonging to the family Maretiidae.

The species of this genus are found in Southern Africa, Australia.

Species:

Spatagobrissus dermodyorum 
Spatagobrissus incus 
Spatagobrissus laubei 
Spatagobrissus mirabilis

References

Echinoidea genera
Spatangoida